Maxine Beneba Clarke is an Australian writer of Afro-Caribbean descent, whose work includes fiction, non-fiction and poetry.

Her collection of short stories Foreign Soil won the 2013 Victorian Premier's Unpublished Manuscript Award, the 2015 ABIA for Best Literary Fiction, the 2015 Indie Award for Best Debut Fiction, and was shortlisted for the 2015 Stella Prize. Her memoir The Hate Race (2016) won the New South Wales Premier's Literary Award, and her poetry collection Carrying The World won the 2017 Victorian Premier's Prize for Poetry. Her picture book The Patchwork Bike (2016), illustrated by Melbourne artist Van Thanh Rudd, won the Crichton Award for Children's Book Illustration. Clarke is a contributor to The Saturday Paper, and is included in the 2019 anthology New Daughters of Africa, edited by Margaret Busby.

Biography
Maxine Beneba Clarke was born and raised in the Sydney suburb of Kellyville. Her mother was an actress of Guyanese heritage and her father an academic of Jamaican descent, who migrated to Australia from England in 1976. She has said: "Cousins, aunts, and uncles of mine have settled all over the world: including in Germany, America, Switzerland, Australia, England, and Barbados. Mine is a complex migration history that spans four continents and many hundreds of years: a history that involves loss of land, loss of agency, loss of language, and loss, transformation, and reclamation of culture."

Beneba Clarke attended school in Kellyville and Baulkham Hills, before going on to earn a Bachelor of Creative Arts and law degree from the University of Wollongong. She moved to Melbourne.

Recognition 
Clarke has received several writing awards and fellowships, including:
 Melbourne Prize for Literature, Civic Choice Award (2021)
Boston Globe–Horn Book Award, Picture Book Award for The Patchwork Bike (2019) 
 Victorian Premier's Prize for Poetry (2017)
 New South Wales Premier's Literary Award, NSW Multicultural Award for The Hate Race (2017)
 Crichton Award for Children's Book Illustration – Honour Book (2017)
 Indie Award for Best Debut Fiction (2015)
 Australian Book Industry Awards (ABIA) – Australian Literary Fiction Book of the Year (2015)
 Sydney Morning Herald Best Young Novelist of the Year (2015)
 Hazel Rowley Literary Fellowship (2014)
 Ada Cambridge Poetry Prize (2013)
 Australia Council Grants (2013)

Works 
Clarke's works include:

 When We Say Black Lives Matter (2020), a picture book illustrated by the author
Meet Taj at the Lighthouse (2020), an early reader chapter book in the Aussie Kids book series.
 The Saturday Portraits (2019), a collection of interviews published in The Saturday Paper
Fashionista (2019), a picture book illustrated by the author
Wide Big World (2018), a picture book illustrated by Isobel Knowles
The Hate Race (2016), an autobiography
Carrying The World (2016), a collection of poetry
The Patchwork Bike (2016), a picture book illustrated by Van Thanh Rudd
Foreign Soil (2014), a collection of short stories
Nothing Here Needs Fixing (2013), a collection of poetry
Gil Scott Heron is on Parole (2008), a collection of poetry
As editor
 Growing Up African in Australia (Black Inc., 2019)
 The Best Australian Stories 2017 (Black Inc., 2017)

References

External links
 
 "The Stella Interview: Maxine Beneba Clarke", 16 March 2015.
 Beejay Silcox, "Racism in Australia: Maxine Beneba Clarke writes from experience", The Australian, 6 August 2016.

Australian writers
1979 births
Living people
Australian Book Review people
Australian people of Guyanese descent
Australian people of Jamaican descent